Aquariids are several meteor showers whose radiant appears to lie in the constellation Aquarius:
Eta Aquariids
Kappa Aquariids
North Delta Aquariids
North Iota Aquariids
Southern Delta Aquariids
South Iota Aquariids
Tau Aquariids

Meteor showers